Staphylococcus agnetis is a Gram positive, coagulase-variable member of the bacterial genus Staphylococcus. Strains of this species were originally isolated from the milk and teats of cows with mastitis. This species is not known to infect humans.

The genome of S. agnetis isolate CBMRN 20813338 has been sequenced and was found to be 2.4 kilobases long with a GC content of 35.79%.

References

External links
Type strain of Staphylococcus agnetis at BacDive -  the Bacterial Diversity Metadatabase

agnetis
Bacteria described in 2012